Orcho Glacier is  long and  wide glacier on the east side of Ravelin Ridge on Clarence Island in the South Shetland Islands, Antarctica situated north of Treskavets Glacier and south-southwest of Banari Glacier.  It flows eastwards and enters the Southern Ocean north of Gesha Point.

The glacier is named after the Bulgarian rebel leader Orcho Voyvoda (1829-1911).

Location
British mapping in 1972 and 2009.

See also
 List of glaciers in the Antarctic
 Glaciology

Maps
British Antarctic Territory. Scale 1:200000 topographic map. DOS 610 Series, Sheet W 61 54. Directorate of Overseas Surveys, Tolworth, UK, 1972.
South Shetland Islands: Elephant, Clarence and Gibbs Islands. Scale 1:220000 topographic map. UK Antarctic Place-names Committee, 2009.
 Antarctic Digital Database (ADD). Scale 1:250000 topographic map of Antarctica. Scientific Committee on Antarctic Research (SCAR). Since 1993, regularly upgraded and updated.

References
 Bulgarian Antarctic Gazetteer. Antarctic Place-names Commission. (details in Bulgarian, basic data in English)
 Orcho Glacier SCAR Composite Gazetteer of Antarctica

External links
 Orcho Glacier. Copernix satellite image

Glaciers of Clarence Island (South Shetland Islands)
Bulgaria and the Antarctic